Lowes Dalbiac Luard (27 August 1872 – 1944) was a British painter.

Early life

Luard was born in Calcutta, the son of a colonel in the Royal Engineers. Educated in England, and having won a place at the University of Oxford to study mathematics at Balliol, he decided instead to study art, and in 1892 enrolled at the Slade School of Fine Art in London, where his contemporaries included Augustus John and Ambrose McEvoy. He left the Slade in 1897 and then studied in Paris under Lucien Simon and Rene Menard. He moved to Paris in 1905 with his wife Louey and their baby daughter Veronica and, except for the war years, lived in the city for almost thirty years. In Paris he became well known for his paintings and drawings of large working horses. Two of his most notable paintings, Timberhauling on the Seine (1914) and Percherons at Water (1911), are from this period.

World War I
Lowes Luard enlisted in the British Army Service Corps in 1914, and served throughout the First World War, being awarded both the DSO, the Croix de Guerre and was mentioned in despatches five times. Even whilst serving in the army Luard continued to draw, usually charcoal studies of horses pulling heavy guns or other loads through mud.
 In 1922, the Société des Artistes Rouennais, in Rouen, exhibited eight paintings and pastels by Luard.

Later life
After the war Luard's interests broadened to include landscapes and seascapes. He moved to London in 1934 and became a regular visitor to the racecourse and stables at Newmarket, where he would often paint scenes of thoroughbred racehorses training on the gallops. In 1936 Faber and Faber published his book The Horse: Its Action and Anatomy, the first study of the skeleton, muscles and physiognomy of the horse since George Stubbs' treatise, The Anatomy of the Horse. During World War II, Lowes Luard was contracted to provide a number of works for the War Artists' Advisory Committee. He died in London in 1944.

Further reading
Oliver Beckett, Horses and Movement: Drawings and Paintings by Lowes Dalbiac Luard (London: J. A. Allen, 1988)

References

External links

 
  (including 3 "from old catalog")

1872 births
1944 deaths
19th-century English painters
English male painters
20th-century English painters
Alumni of the Slade School of Fine Art
British Army personnel of World War I
British draughtsmen
British war artists
Companions of the Distinguished Service Order
Recipients of the Croix de Guerre 1914–1918 (France)
Royal Army Service Corps officers
20th-century English male artists
19th-century English male artists